Dave Stewart and the Spiritual Cowboys was an English rock and pop band, formed in 1990 after frontman David A. Stewart's departure from Eurythmics. Chris Bostock from JoBoxers, Jonathan Perkins, Olle Romo and Nan Vernon were later joined by Martin Chambers from The Pretenders and John Turnbull from Ian Dury and The Blockheads. They made two albums: the self-titled Dave Stewart and the Spiritual Cowboys and Honest.  Their live stage act is characterized by spiritual icons and a unique double drum kit played by two drummers.

Discography

Albums
 Dave Stewart and the Spiritual Cowboys (BMG, 1990) – UK #38, AUS #51, NED #50, NOR #20, SWE #9
 Honest (BMG, 1991) – AUS #187, NED #86, SWE #49
 Live at Rockpalast - Köln 1990 (2016; 1 DVD + 2 CD)

Singles

References

External links
http://www.dnafiles.net/dna/item/dsspcowboys.htm

English pop music groups
English new wave musical groups